Winifred Ann Taylor, Baroness Taylor of Bolton,  (born 2 July 1947) is a British politician and life peer who served in the Cabinet of the United Kingdom from 1997 to 2001. A member of the Labour Party, she was Member of Parliament (MP) for Bolton West from 1974 to 1983, and Dewsbury from 1987 to 2005.

Early life and education
Winifred Ann Taylor was born on 2 July 1947 in London, England. Her mother was born in Lancashire and her grandfather hailed from Motherwell, Scotland, serving as chairman of local Labour Party. Taylor was educated at Bolton School and the University of Bradford, where she graduated with a BSc in Politics and History in 1969.

Political career
Taylor contested the marginal Bolton West constituency at the February 1974 general election, but lost to incumbent Conservative Robert Redmond by a majority of 603 votes. However, she was elected to represent the same constituency in October 1974, defeating Redmond with a majority of 903.

During her first term in Parliament, she served in the Callaghan government as an assistant whip from 1977 to 1979. Notably the first female whip in the UK Parliament, she was later depicted in the 2012 play This House.

Re-elected at the 1979 general election with a reduced majority of 600 votes, she unsuccessfully contested the new Bolton North East seat in 1983, defeated by Conservative Peter Thurnham. Taylor returned to Parliament upon her election to the Dewsbury constituency at the 1987 general election, representing the seat until her retirement in 2005.

When she returned to the House of Commons in 1987, Taylor became a shadow minister under Labour leader Neil Kinnock; covering education and science from 1979 to 1981 and the environment from 1981 to 1992. She then served in the Shadow Cabinets of John Smith and Tony Blair as Shadow Secretary of State for Education from 1992 to 1994, Shadow Chancellor of the Duchy of Lancaster from 1994 to 1995 and Shadow Leader of the House of Commons from 1994 to 1997.

In the first Blair ministry, Taylor became the first woman to serve as Leader of the House of Commons and Lord President of the Privy Council in 1997. After a 1998 cabinet reshuffle, she went on to become the first woman to serve as Government Chief Whip (Parliamentary Secretary to the Treasury).

As a backbencher, Taylor served as chair of the Intelligence and Security Committee from 2001 to 2005. Her appointment to this post was criticised by opposition Liberal Democrats. She also sponsored a Private Member's Bill, the 'Succession to the Crown (no 2)' Bill, which sought to eliminate gender and religious discrimination in the royal succession.

On 13 May 2005 it was announced that Taylor was to be given a life peerage, and she was created Baroness Taylor of Bolton, of Bolton in the County of Greater Manchester, on 13 June 2005. She was made Minister for Defence Procurement on 7 November 2007, following Lord Drayson's decision to resign to compete in the American Le Mans Series; unlike her predecessor, she was paid. Following the Brown reshuffle of October 2008, she was moved to a new post at both the Ministry of Defence and the Foreign and Commonwealth Office as Minister for International Defence and Security.

In September 2022 she became a member of the House of Lords Appointments Commission, filling the quota for the Labour Party.

References

External links
 Guardian Politics Ask Aristotle – Ann Taylor
 
 They Work For You – Ann Taylor

|-

|-

|-

|-

|-

|-

|-

|-

|-

|-

|-

|-

|-

1947 births
Living people
Alumni of the University of Bradford
Female members of the Parliament of the United Kingdom for English constituencies
Female members of the Cabinet of the United Kingdom
Labour Party (UK) MPs for English constituencies
Labour Party (UK) life peers
Leaders of the House of Commons of the United Kingdom
Life peeresses created by Elizabeth II
Lord Presidents of the Council
Members of the Privy Council of the United Kingdom
People educated at Bolton School
UK MPs 1974–1979
UK MPs 1979–1983
UK MPs 1987–1992
UK MPs 1992–1997
UK MPs 1997–2001
UK MPs 2001–2005
20th-century British women politicians
21st-century British women politicians
Members of the Parliament of the United Kingdom for Bolton West
20th-century English women
20th-century English people
21st-century English women
21st-century English people